The Balkan donkey or mountain donkey, is a breed or group of breeds of domestic donkey originating in the Balkan region. It is reported from Serbia and Montenegro.

A herd of about 120 Balkan donkeys in the Zasavica Reserve, Sremska Mitrovica, Serbia, are used to make the world's most expensive cheese, pule cheese.

References 

Donkey breeds